Alberto Zamot Bula (born 19 November 1942 in Utuado, Puerto Rico) is a Puerto Rican former basketball player who competed in the 1964 Summer Olympics and in the 1968 Summer Olympics.

BSN career
Zamot played 14 seasons as a professional basketball player at the Baloncesto Superior Nacional league, all with the Vaqueros de Bayamón. He helped the Vaqueros win several national championships during the 1970s.

See also
List of Puerto Ricans

References

External links
 

1942 births
Living people
Basketball players at the 1964 Summer Olympics
Basketball players at the 1968 Summer Olympics
Basketball players at the 1967 Pan American Games
People from Utuado, Puerto Rico
Puerto Rican men's basketball players
1967 FIBA World Championship players
Olympic basketball players of Puerto Rico
Baloncesto Superior Nacional players
Pan American Games competitors for Puerto Rico